Splitsvilla 10, styled as Splitsvilla X, is the tenth season of the Indian reality TV series MTV Splitsvilla. It premiered on 23 July 2017 on MTV India. Hosted by Sunny Leone and Rannvijay Singha.The show consisted of ten boys and ten girls +1 wild card who came to find true love. The theme of the season was "Experiment of Love", i.e. experimenting and testing whether love can be found through science or not. There was a new concept of ideal matches. The show was shot in Jim Corbett National Park. It was the second season to stream on Voot. The season ended on 10 December 2017 with Naina Singh and Baseer Ali being declared as the winners.

Contestants

References

External links 

Official website

Indian reality television series
2017 Indian television series debuts
MTV (Indian TV channel) original programming
Hindi-language television shows
Flavor of Love
Dating and relationship reality television series